The 2018–19 Purdue Fort Wayne Mastodons women's basketball team represents Purdue University Fort Wayne during the 2018–19 NCAA Division I women's basketball season. The Mastodons, led by third year head coach Niecee Nelson and played their home games at play their home games at the Hilliard Gates Sports Center, with one home game at the Allen County War Memorial Coliseum. They were members of The Summit League. They finished the season 7–23, 3–13 in Summit League play to finish in eighth place. They lost in the quarterfinals of the Summit League women's tournament to South Dakota State.

The season marks the first for the school representing the new Purdue University Fort Wayne. The team previously represented the now defunct Indiana University – Purdue University Fort Wayne. On July 1, 2018, IPFW split into two separate institutions, with IU taking responsibility for IPFW's degree programs in health sciences and Purdue retaining all other academic programs. The Mastodons now represent Purdue University Fort Wayne. With the name change, the school's colors changed from Royal Blue and White to the Old Gold and Black used by the other three Purdue University campuses. On June 18, 2018, the school announced that beginning July 1, 2018 all NCAA sports teams would be known as the Purdue Fort Wayne Mastadons. In addition, a new logo was revealed where the color blue has been incorporated as a secondary color to the university's official school colors of gold and black.

Roster

Schedule

|-
!colspan=9 style=| Non-conference regular season

|-
!colspan=9 style=| Summit League regular season

|-
!colspan=9 style=| Summit League Women's Tournament

See also
2018–19 Purdue Fort Wayne Mastodons men's basketball team

References

Purdue Fort Wayne Mastodons women's basketball
Purdue Fort Wayne
Purdue Fort Wayne
Purdue Fort Wayne